Robert Pitcairn (May 6, 1836 – July 25, 1909) was a Scottish-American railroad executive who headed the Pittsburgh Division of the Pennsylvania Railroad in the late 19th century. He was the brother of the Pittsburgh Plate Glass Company (now PPG Industries, Inc.) founder, John Pitcairn, Jr.

Personal life
Pitcairn was born in Johnstone, Renfrewshire, Scotland. He accompanied his parents to the United States and settled in Pittsburgh, Pennsylvania.

On July 26, 1856, Robert Pitcairn married Elizabeth Erb Rigg of Altoona, Pa.  Their children were: Agnes Laurene Pitcairn (born in 1857),  Lillian Pitcairn (born in 1859), Susan Blanche Pitcairn (born in 1868) and Robert Pitcairn, Jr. (born on October 2, 1874). In 1906, Mr. and Mrs. Robert Pitcairn Jr. built a house in Pasadena, California, designed by the outstanding architectural firm Greene and Greene.

The Pitcairn family home was at the corner of Ellsworth and Amberson avenues in the Shadyside section of Pittsburgh. Robert Pitcairn was a deeply religious man: he lived his Scottish Presbyterian beliefs as a founder, longtime member, and leader of the Shadyside Presbyterian Church in Pittsburgh's fashionable East End.  Before the congregation built its current building, for many years, Pitcairn served as its choir director.

Career

Pitcairn's first job was as a messenger boy for the Eastern Telegraph Company where he worked alongside future steel magnate Andrew Carnegie. In 1853, when Carnegie left to work for the Pennsylvania Railroad, he got Pitcairn a job as a ticket agent at the Mountain House at Hollidaysburg, from there he was transferred to Altoona. Both men worked their way up the corporate ranks rapidly.  When Andrew Carnegie left the railroad to start Carnegie Steel, Pitcairn replaced Carnegie as general agent and superintendent of the Pittsburgh division of the Pennsylvania Railroad. He was also a friend and financial backer of George Westinghouse.

Pitcairn ordered construction of a rail yard along Turtle Creek near Pittsburgh that would become the largest rail yard in the world.  The borough of Pitcairn, Pennsylvania, located adjacent to the yard, was named in his honor.

Riots of 1877
Pitcairn was the superintendent of the Pittsburgh division of the Pennsylvania Railroad Company beginning in the Spring of 1865, and occupied that position during the 1877 riots which occurred in Pittsburgh Pa., as part of larger national railroad riots occurring the same year.

Political and social career
Pitcairn was a member of the South Fork Fishing and Hunting Club.  The club, founded by Henry Clay Frick and composed of wealthy Pittsburgh industrialists including Carnegie, Andrew Mellon and Philander Knox, owned the South Fork Dam which collapsed on May 31, 1889, causing the Johnstown Flood. Pitcairn was responsible for sending the first relief train to Johnstown to assist flood victims. He was one of the Directors of the Carnegie Public Library in Pittsburgh.

A Republican, Pitcairn served as a Presidential Elector for Pennsylvania in 1904.

Retirement and death
While serving as superintendent of the Pennsylvania Railroad, Pitcairn was instrumental in implementing a policy that every worker who had been with the company at least 25 years should be pensioned upon reaching the age of 70. He was to become the first recipient of this policy; when he reached 70, President A.J. Cassatt required that Pitcairn, then serving as Resident Assistant to the President, retire. From this point on, Pitcairn's health declined, and in 1909 he died from a "general breakdown".

References

External links
 Pitcairn's testimony at the PRR's Johnstown Flood inquiry
Scotland's mark on America - Scots in banking, finance, insurance and railroads

1836 births
1909 deaths
19th-century American railroad executives
Andrew Carnegie
Businesspeople from Pittsburgh
Pennsylvania Republicans
People from Johnstone
Pitcairn family
Scottish emigrants to the United States